Jaime Javier Hernández Bertrán (born 18 January 1972 in Barcelona) is a Spanish former cyclist. He rode in 5 editions of the Vuelta a España and two editions of the Tour de France.

Major results
1996
3rd National Time Trial Championships
2001
9th Overall Four Days of Dunkirk

References

1972 births
Living people
Spanish male cyclists
Cyclists from Barcelona